The Sicilian is a 1987 epic historical drama film directed and co-produced by Michael Cimino. The film was adapted by Steve Shagan and an uncredited Gore Vidal from Mario Puzo's 1984 novel of the same name. Christopher Lambert stars as Salvatore Giuliano, the infamous bandit who tried to liberate early 1950s Sicily from Italian rule. The film also stars Terence Stamp, Joss Ackland, John Turturro and Barbara Sukowa.

Plot
Salvatore Giuliano, an infamous bandit, together with his ragtag band of guerrillas, attempted to liberate early 1950s Sicily from Italian rule and make it an American state. Giuliano robs from the rich landowners to give to the peasants, who in turn hail him as their savior. As his popularity grows, so does his ego, and he eventually thinks he is above the power of his backer, Mafia Don Masino Croce. Don Croce, in turn, sets out to kill the upstart by convincing his cousin and closest adviser Gaspare "Aspanu" Pisciotta to assassinate him.

Cast

Christopher Lambert as Salvatore Giuliano
Terence Stamp as Prince Borsa
Joss Ackland as Don Masino Croce
John Turturro as Gaspare "Aspanu" Pisciotta
Barbara Sukowa as Camilla, Duchess of Crotone
Richard Bauer as Hector Adonis
Giulia Boschi as Giovanna Ferra
Ray McAnally as Trezza
Barry Miller as Dr. Nattore
Andreas Katsulas as Passatempo
Michael Wincott as Cpl. Silvestro Canio
Ramon Bieri as Quintana
Oliver Cotton as Cmdr. Roccofino
Joe Regalbuto as Father Doldana
Aldo Ray as Don Siano of Bisacquino
Derrick Branche as Terranova

Production

Development
Due to the huge success of The Godfather, Mario Puzo was given $1 million for the film rights to his novel The Sicilian. David Begelman, head of Gladden Entertainment at the time, hired Michael Cimino to direct. When producer Bruce McNall met with Cimino at a dinner in Los Angeles, he complained loudly about the script and Begelman's interference with casting. Cimino wanted Christopher Lambert for the lead role and Begelman was concerned about a French actor starring in a film about an Italian hero in an English-speaking film. To move forward, Begelman and McNall gave Cimino what he wanted with regards to the script and casting.

Gore Vidal did some uncredited rewrite work on the film. Vidal sued both screenwriter Steve Shagan and the Writers Guild of America to receive screenplay credit: "I was defrauded of my work." Vidal eventually won the suit against WGA. In the DVD commentary of Year of the Dragon, Cimino said he learned a lot from working with Vidal.

Shooting
The film was shot on location in Sicily in the spring and summer of 1986. In late April 1986, Begelman and McNall discovered that the film was over budget and behind schedule. The problems involved mostly hang-ups with personnel and equipment, nothing on the scale of Cimino's Heaven's Gate. One exception was some low-level Mafia men who controlled certain locations and union workers. Cimino suggested that Begelman and McNall meet with Mafia men to overcome the impasse. Upon meeting them in a restaurant off the main piazza, the producers discovered that the Mafia men wanted to appear in the film. "Once we all understood," wrote McNall, "the fix was easy. There were plenty of little roles for walk-ons and extras. And if a real role didn't exist, we could pretend to involve some of the guys and throw them a day's pay." Once the problem was solved, Cimino had access to the countryside and the local labor pool.

Post-production
After location work was finished, Cimino took the footage straight to his editing room to begin cutting. Cimino did not report any of his progress on the editing as the months passed until he delivered a 150-minute cut of the film and declared that he was done. Under his contract with the producers, Cimino had the right to final cut as long as the film was under 120 minutes long. Cimino insisted that no more cuts could be made and pressed Begelman and McNall to present the current version to 20th Century Fox, the film's domestic distributor. Before viewing the film, the Fox executives said to the producers that the film was so long that it limited the number of showings a theater could present each day. It had to be trimmed or Fox would not release it.

When Begelman and McNall relayed Fox's ruling to Cimino, he exploded. "I've been cutting for six months. There's nothing more to take out!" he shouted. The producers responded that there had to be a way to tell the story in 120 minutes. Cimino answered, "Fine! You want it shorter, you got it." A few days later, Cimino delivered a new version of the film in which all of the action scenes were cut out. "In the script a big wedding scene in the mountains is followed by an attack on the wedding party." wrote McNall. "In what we saw the wedding was followed by a scene at a hospital, where all the people in nice clothes were being treated for their wounds. He just cut out the battle." Begelman did not wait until the film ended to get on the phone and immediately called Cimino. Cimino said that his contract allowed him final cut in a 120-minute film and what he gave them qualified.

Lawsuit
As a result of the impasse with Cimino, the producers went to arbitration. "Every day that passed without the film being complete cost us and our partners—Fox and Dino DeLaurentiis—money." wrote McNall. "The judge in the arbitration acknowledged that problem and gave us a speedy hearing." Bert Fields represented the producers. Cimino's lawyers used a precedent established by Fields in an earlier case: Fields aided Warren Beatty's win in a dispute over final cut with the producers of the movie Reds, a finding that stated a contract granting a director final cut was absolutely binding. The producers challenged the claim that Cimino's 120-minute version of the film was a legitimate piece of work. "It was an act of bad faith," argued McNall, "no matter what the contract said."

Dino DeLaurentiis was called in to testify as an expert witness. DeLaurentiis had overseen Cimino's Year of the Dragon, set the precedent for giving Cimino final cut in the contract for that film and even gave Cimino a positive recommendation to Begelman for The Sicilian. However, when DeLaurentiis took the stand:
"Final cut? I no give-a him final cut," he declared.
"But we've seen the contract," said Fields.
"Have you seen the side letter?" asked DeLaurentiis.
A subsequently unearthed side letter stated that notwithstanding the contract, Cimino did not have the right to final cut on Year of the Dragon. Fields argued that by withholding the side letter, Cimino defrauded the producers. The judge agreed. Begelman personally trimmed the film to 115 minutes.

Release
Fox released The Sicilian on October 23, 1987, in 370 theaters. The film opened at #7 on the box office charts, grossing $1,720,351 and averaging $4,649 per theater. The film's domestic box office gross eventually totaled $5,406,879. According to McNall, the losses on The Sicilian were offset by the profits from Gladden's other 1987 release Mannequin, which unlike The Sicilian, became a box office hit.

Reception
Critical reaction to the film was fairly negative. Many critics panned the film's incoherent narrative, muddy visual style, and the casting of Lambert in the lead as Giuliano. Gene Siskel and Roger Ebert gave The Sicilian "two thumbs down". Ebert complained about the cinematography: "The film alternates between scenes that are backlit where you can't see the faces and other scenes that were so murky that you couldn't see who was talking." Siskel attacked the film's star, "Let me just go after Christopher Lambert... because here is the center of the film. This would be as if the Al Pacino character in The Godfather were played by a member of the walking dead." In his Chicago Sun-Times review, Ebert claimed The Sicilian continues director Michael Cimino's "record of making an incomprehensible mess out of every other film he directs", contrasting the "power and efficiency" of The Deer Hunter and The Year of the Dragon with the "half-visible meditations on backlighting" of Heaven's Gate and The Sicilian.

Vincent Canby of The New York Times said, "Cimino's fondness for amber lighting and great, sweeping camera movements are evident from time to time, but the film is mostly a garbled synopsis of the Puzo novel." Variety added "Cimino seems to be aiming for an operatic telling of the short career of the violent 20th-century folk hero [based on Mario Puzo's novel], but falls into an uncomfortable middle ground between European artfulness and stock Hollywood conventions." Hal Hinson of The Washington Post felt it was "unambiguously atrocious, but in that very special, howlingly grandiose manner that only a filmmaker with visions of epic greatness working on a large scale with a multinational cast can achieve." Leonard Maltin rated the film a "BOMB", calling it a "militantly lugubrious bio of Salvatore Giuliano".

Producer McNall was personally disappointed by the film. "Given that The Sicilian was a descendant of Puzo's The Godfather," wrote McNall, "I had expected something with the same beauty, drama, and emotion. Cimino had shown with The Deer Hunter that he was capable of making such a movie. But he had failed." McNall even quoted Ebert's review in his appraisal of The Sicilian, "Ebert criticized the cast, the cinematography, the script, even the sound quality. He was right about all of it."

Rotten Tomatoes gives The Sicilian a 10% "Rotten" rating, based on 20 reviews, with an average rating of 3.9/10.

Alternative versions
A 146-minute director's cut was released theatrically in France and is available on VHS, DVD and Blu-Ray in the United States, and in Europe as a region 2 DVD. This version received mixed reviews when it initially opened in Paris. Maltin gave the director's cut of The Sicilian two stars out of four, writing that the film "seems shorter, thanks to more coherency and Sukowa's strengthened role. Neither version, though, can overcome two chief liabilities: Cimino's missing sense of humor and Lambert's laughably stone-faced performance." Film critic F.X. Feeney lauded this version of the film, and in an article of L.A. Weekly, he compared and contrasted the two particular versions. He mentioned that Fox's cut removed "three major sequences, four major scenes, and about 100 lines of dialogue," stated that Lambert's performance was botched by the studio's tinkering, and that Sukowa's voice was dubbed by another actress in said version. Feeney went on to call The Sicilian "a masterpiece" and "a work of genius," and declared it as the best film of 1987.

See also
Salvatore Giuliano, a 1962 Italian film directed by Francesco Rosi.
Salvatore Giuliano, a 1986 Italian opera by Lorenzo Ferrero

References

Annotations

Notes

Bibliography

Further reading

External links

The Sicilian on MichaelCimino.fr (French)

1987 films
20th Century Fox films
1980s crime drama films
American crime drama films
Biographical films about Italian bandits
Films about the Sicilian Mafia
Films directed by Michael Cimino
Films scored by David Mansfield
Mafia films
1987 drama films
Films shot in Italy
1980s English-language films
Salvatore Giuliano
1980s American films